Mullaghglass (also spelt Mullaglass) is a small village and townland north of Newry in County Armagh, Northern Ireland. It was named after the nearby townland of Mullaghglass, although the village itself is within the townland of Latt. In the 2001 Census it had a population of 135. It is within the Newry and Mourne District Council area.

Education
Mullaglass Primary School

Churches 
St. Luke's Mullaglass Church of Ireland
Mullaghglass Free Presbyterian Church

References

External links
NI Neighbourhood Information System

Villages in County Armagh
Townlands of County Armagh